Gerhard Bockman (1686–1773) was a Dutch portrait painter and mezzotint engraver.

Works
Bockman was known as an artist in Amsterdam; by 1711, he was active in England, and was a subscriber of the Great Queen Street Academy.

He painted several portraits of William Augustus, Duke of Cumberland, and a life-size half-length of Edward Russell, 1st Earl of Orford. He copied after Godfrey Kneller, and engraved portraits in mezzotint after Anthony van Dyck, Jacob van Loo, Michael Dahl, James Worsdale, and others. He painted and engraved (1743) a picture of St Dunstan holding the Devil by the nose with tongs. Karl Heinrich von Heinecken mentions amongst his portraits those of Thomas Chubb the deist, of Thomas Pelham-Holles, 1st Duke of Newcastle, of Charles Talbot, 1st Baron Talbot, and of William Walker.

References

Further reading
 
 
 

 

 

1686 births
1773 deaths
18th-century Dutch painters
18th-century Dutch male artists
Dutch male painters
18th-century engravers
Painters from Amsterdam 
Engravers from Amsterdam
Dutch expatriates in England